The Danish Futsal Championship is the premier  futsal championship in Denmark. Organized by Danish Football Association.

Champions

External links
futsalplanet.com

Futsal competitions in Denmark
Denmark
futsal
2007 establishments in Denmark
Sports leagues established in 2007